Indian Rocks Dining Hall is a historic building located near Reedsville, Preston County, West Virginia. The dining hall was built in 1928, and  stories, with a hip porch on three sides.  The front facade is of brown fieldstone with a large fireplace at the center front of the building.  It is in the rustic Adirondack style.  Also on the property are a contributing tourist cabin (c. 1928), ice / spring house (1928), and ice pond (c. 1928). The property was developed in the late-1920s, by John Henry Hunt, Sr, who was a pioneer in African American entrepreneurship and worked for the advancement of African Americans in West Virginia.

It was listed on the National Register of Historic Places in 2003.

References

African-American historic places
African-American history of West Virginia
Commercial buildings on the National Register of Historic Places in West Virginia
Commercial buildings completed in 1928
Buildings and structures in Preston County, West Virginia
Rustic architecture in West Virginia
National Register of Historic Places in Preston County, West Virginia
Stone buildings in the United States
1928 establishments in West Virginia